In enzymology, a penicillin amidase is an enzyme that catalyzes the chemical reaction

penicillin + H2O  a carboxylate + 6-aminopenicillanate

Thus, the two substrates of this enzyme are penicillin and H2O, whereas its two products are carboxylate and 6-aminopenicillanate.

This enzyme belongs to the family of hydrolases, those acting on carbon-nitrogen bonds other than peptide bonds, specifically in linear amides.  The systematic name of this enzyme class is penicillin amidohydrolase. Other names in common use include penicillin acylase, benzylpenicillin acylase, novozym 217, semacylase, alpha-acylamino-beta-lactam acylhydrolase, and ampicillin acylase.  This enzyme participates in penicillin and cephalosporin biosynthesis.

Structural studies

References

 

EC 3.5.1
Enzymes of known structure